Amsterdamsche Football Club Ajax, also referred to as AFC Ajax, Ajax Amsterdam or simply Ajax (after the legendary Greek hero), is a professional football club from Amsterdam, Netherlands. 

Ajax is historically one of the most successful clubs in the world; according to the IFFHS, Ajax were the seventh most successful European club of the 20th century. The club is one of the five teams that has earned the right to keep the European Cup and to wear a multiple-winner badge; they won consecutively in 1971–1973. In 1972, they completed the European treble by winning the Dutch Eredivisie, KNVB Cup, and the European Cup; to date, they are the only team to keep the European Cup and accomplish the European treble. Ajax's last international trophies were the 1995 Intercontinental Cup and the 1995 Champions League, where they defeated Milan in the final; they lost the 1996 Champions League final on penalties to Juventus.

They are also one of three teams to win the treble and the Intercontinental Cup in the same season/calendar year; This was achieved in the 1971–72 season. Ajax, Juventus, Bayern Munich, Chelsea and Manchester United are the five clubs to have won all three major UEFA club competitions. They have also won the Intercontinental Cup twice, the 1991–92 UEFA Cup, as well as the Karl Rappan Cup, a predecessor of the UEFA Intertoto Cup in 1962.

This list includes past and present footballers who have played for Ajax.

List of players
Players listed below with dual citizenship, are listed with their country of birth first, followed by their second citizenship, unless a player has represented one of their nations on an International level, in which case the team which they have played for is listed first, and their other nationality is listed second.

In some instances, three flags may be listed to represent a player's nationality. This is the case when a player is born in a country to parents of both different nationalities, which also differ from the country of their child's birthplace, however, the player represents his country of birth Internationally. An example of this would be Patrick Kluivert, who is Dutch and plays for the Dutch national team, while his father is from Suriname, and his mother is from Curaçao. In these cases the paternal citizenship is listed second to the players' primary nationality, followed by the nation of the player's mother thirdly.

Players who were born in a foreign country, but do not hold citizenship of that nation, do not have the country of their birthplace listed below as their nationality, while some players have become naturalised citizens of a country, in which case it is listed as well.

Players with no league caps or goals may have made appearances in other competitions, as only league appearances and goals are being tallied in the list below.

Caps and goals accurate as of 8 January 2023 after the last match played against N.E.C..

Club captains

National team players
The following players were called-up to represent their national teams in international football and received caps during their tenure with AFC Ajax:

	

Argentina
  Lisandro Martínez (2019–2022)
  Mauro Rosales (2004–2007)
  Nicolás Tagliafico (2018–2022)
Armenia
  Edgar Manucharyan (2005–2010)
  Aras Özbiliz (2010–2012)
Austria
  Felix Gasselich (1983–1985)
  Florian Grillitsch (2022–present)
  Heinz Schilcher (1971–1973)
  Maximilian Wöber (2017–2019)
Belgium
  Toby Alderweireld (2008–2013)
  Jelle Van Damme (2002–2004)
  Tom Soetaers (2004–2005)
  Wesley Sonck (2003–2005)
  Thomas Vermaelen (2003–2009)
  Jan Vertonghen (2008–2013)
Brazil
  Antony (2020–2022)
  David Neres (2017–2022)
  Márcio Santos (1995–1997)
Burkina Faso
  Bertrand Traoré (2016–2017)
  Lassina Traoré (2019–2021)
Cameroon
  Eyong Enoh (2008–2014)
  André Onana (2015–2022)
Colombia
  Davinson Sánchez (2016–2017)
Costa Rica
  Froylán Ledezma (1997–2001)
Czech Republic
  Tomáš Galásek (2000–2006)
  Zdeněk Grygera (2003–2007)
Denmark
  Lucas Andersen (2012–2016)
  Frank Arnesen (1975–1981)
  Nicolai Boilesen (2011–2016)
  Mohamed Daramy (2021–present)
  Kasper Dolberg (2016–2019)
  Christian Eriksen (2010–2013)
  Viktor Fischer (2012–2016)
  Jesper Grønkjær (1998–2000)
  Henning Jensen (1979–1981)
  Michael Krohn-Dehli (2006–2008)
  Søren Lerby (1975–1983)
  Jan Mølby (1982–1984)
  Jesper Olsen (1981–1984)
  Kenneth Perez (2006–2007, 2008)
  Dennis Rommedahl (2007–2010)
  Lasse Schöne (2012–2019)
Egypt
  Mido (2001–2003, 2010)
Finland
  Jari Litmanen (1992–1999, 2002–2004)
  Niklas Moisander (2004–2006, 2012–2015)
  Petri Pasanen (2000–2004)
  Petri Tiainen (1986–1989)
Georgia
  Shota Arveladze (1997–2001)
  Georgi Kinkladze (1998–2000)
Germany
  Amin Younes (2015–2018)
Ghana
  Mohammed Kudus (2020–present)
  Anthony Obodai (2001–2005)
  Abubakari Yakubu (1999–2005)
Greece
  Angelos Charisteas (2005–2006)
  Nikos Machlas (1999–2003)
Hungary
  Pál Fischer (1989–1990)
Iceland
  Kolbeinn Sigþórsson (2011–2015)
Indonesia
  Ezra Walian (2016–2017)
Ivory Coast
  Sébastien Haller (2021–2022)
Mexico
  Edson Álvarez (2019–present)
  Jorge Sánchez (2022–present)
Morocco
  Ismaïl Aissati (2008–2012)
  Nourdin Boukhari (2002–2006)
  Mounir El Hamdaoui (2010–2012)
  Noussair Mazraoui (2016–2022)
  Hakim Ziyech (2016–2020)

Netherlands
  Wim Addicks (1922–1931)
  Wim Anderiesen (1925–1940)
  Vurnon Anita (2005–2012)
  Ryan Babel (2004–2007; 2012–2013; 2020)
  Marco van Basten (1982–1987)
  Riechedly Bazoer (2014–2017)
  Donny van de Beek (2015–2020)
  Steven Berghuis (2021–present)
  Dennis Bergkamp (1986–1993)
  Steven Bergwijn (2022–present)
  Daley Blind (2008–2014; 2018–2022)
  Danny Blind (1986–1999)
  Frank de Boer (1988–1998)
  Jan de Boer (1920–1933)
  Ronald de Boer (1987–1991; 1993–1998)
  Peter Boeve (1979–1988)
  Winston Bogarde (1994–1997)
  Hans Boskamp (1949–1954)
  John Bosman (1983–1988)
  Jasper Cillessen (2011–2016)
  Johan Cruyff (1964–1973; 1981–1983)
  Edgar Davids (1992–1996; 2007–2008)
  Jan van Diepenbeek (1929–1938)
  Dick van Dijk (1969–1972)
  Joop van Dort (1912–1922)
  Guus Dräger (1941–1951)
  Theo van Duivenbode (1964–1969)
  Anwar El Ghazi (2014–2017)
  Urby Emanuelson (2004–2011)
  Ge Fortgens (1906–1914)
  Ruud Geels (1974–1978)
  Eddy Pieters Graafland (1952–1958)
  Ryan Gravenberch (2018–2022)
  Henk Groot (1959–1963; 1965–1969)
  Arie Haan (1969–1975)
  John Heitinga (2001–2008; 2015–2016)
  Henk Hordijk (1917–1927)
  Barry Hulshoff (1966–1977)
  Klaas-Jan Huntelaar (2005–2009; 2017–2021)
  Frenkie de Jong (2016–2019)
  Nigel de Jong (2002–2006)
  Siem de Jong (2007–2014; 2017–2020)
  Wim Jonk (1988–1993)
  Piet Keizer (1960–1975)
  Wim Kieft (1979–1983)
  Davy Klaassen (2011–2017; 2020–present)
  Justin Kluivert (2016–2018)
  Patrick Kluivert (1994–1997)
  Ronald Koeman (1983–1986)
  Dolf van Kol (1924–1932)
  Ruud Krol (1968–1980)
  Piet van der Kuil (1955–1959)
  Henk van der Linden (1939–1940; 1945–1948)
  Tschen La Ling (1975–1982)
  Matthijs de Ligt (2016–2019)
  Hedwiges Maduro (2003–2008)
  Stanley Menzo (1983–1994; 1999–2000)
  Andy van der Meyde (1997–2003)
  Rinus Michels (1965–1971; 1975–1976)
  Arnold Mühren (1971–1974; 1985–1989)
  Gerrie Mühren (1968–1976)
  Bennie Muller (1958–1970)
  Jan de Natris (1914–1921; 1923–1925)
  Johan Neeskens (1970–1974)
  Klaas Nuninga (1964–1969)
  Edo Ophof (1980–1988)
  Piet Ouderland (1955–1964)
  Marc Overmars (1992–1997)
  Remko Pasveer (2021–present)
  Fons Pelser (1913–1926)
  Peet Petersen (1960–1965)
  Jan Potharst (1939–1952)
  Co Prins (1959–1963; 1965–1967)
  Quincy Promes (2019–2021)
  Anton Pronk (1960–1970)
  Michael Reiziger (1990–1996)
  Devyne Rensch (2020–present)
  Johnny Rep (1971–1975)
  Ricardo van Rhijn (2011–2016)
  Jaïro Riedewald (2013–2017)
  Frank Rijkaard (1980–1987; 1993–1995)
  Nico Rijnders (1969–1971)
  Bryan Roy (1988–1992)
  Edwin van der Sar (1990–1999)
  John van 't Schip (1981–1992)
  Dick Schoenaker (1976–1985)
  Piet Schrijvers (1974–1983)
  Clarence Seedorf (1992–1995)
  Sonny Silooy (1980–1987; 1989–1996)
  Wesley Sneijder (2002–2007)
	
Netherlands (continued)
  Ronald Spelbos (1984–1988)
  Maarten Stekelenburg (2002–2011; 2020–present)
  Joop Stoffelen (1940–1950)
  Wim Suurbier (1964–1977)
  Sjaak Swart (1956–1973)
  Simon Tahamata (1976–1980)
  Kenneth Taylor (2020–present)
  Kenny Tete (2013–2017)
  Jurriën Timber (2020–present)
  Rafael van der Vaart (2000–2005)
  Gerald Vanenburg (1980–1986)
  Joël Veltman (2012–2020)
  Kenneth Vermeer (2005–2014)
  Nick Viergever (2014–2018)
  Wim Volkers (1923–1936)
  Peter van Vossen (1993–1995)
  Gregory van der Wiel (2007–2012)
  Aron Winter (1986–1992; 1999–2003)
  Rob de Wit (1984–1986)
  Richard Witschge (1986–1991; 1996–2003)
  Jan Wouters (1986–1992)
  Demy de Zeeuw (2009–2011)
Nigeria
  Tijani Babangida (1996–2003)
  Calvin Bassey (2022–present)
  Finidi George (1993–1996)
  Pius Ikedia (1999–2005)
  Christopher Kanu (1996–2002)
  Nwankwo Kanu (1993–1996)
  Sunday Oliseh (1997–1999)
Norway
  André Bergdølmo (2000–2003)
Poland
  Arkadiusz Milik (2014–2016)
  Andrzej Rudy (1997–1999)
Portugal
  Dani (1996–2000)
Republic of Ireland
  Frank Stapleton (1987)
Romania
  Cristian Chivu (1999–2003)
  Bogdan Lobonț (2000–2006)
  Răzvan Marin (2019–2021)
  Nicolae Mitea (2003–2008)
  George Ogăraru (2006–2010)
Serbia
  Nemanja Gudelj (2015–2017)
  Marko Pantelić (2009–2010)
  Miralem Sulejmani (2008–2013)
  Dušan Tadić (2018–present)
South Africa
  Benni McCarthy (1997–1999)
  Aaron Mokoena (1999–2003)
  Steven Pienaar (2001–2006)
  Thulani Serero (2011–2017)
  Hans Vonk (2004–2006; 2008–2009)
South Korea
  Suk Hyun-jun (2009–2011)
Suriname
  Sean Klaiber (2020–2022)
Sweden
  Kennedy Bakırcıoğlu (2007–2010)
  Inge Danielsson (1968–1969)
  Zlatan Ibrahimović (2001–2004)
  Peter Larsson (1987–1991)
  Rasmus Lindgren (2005; 2008–2011)
  Stefan Pettersson (1988–1994)
  Markus Rosenberg (2005–2007)
  Tobias Sana (2012–2015)
Tunisia
  Hatem Trabelsi (2001–2006)
United States
  Sergiño Dest (2019–2020)
  John O'Brien (1998–2005)
Uruguay
  Nicolás Lodeiro (2010–2012)
  Bruno Silva (2008–2012)
  Luis Suárez (2007–2011)
Yugoslavia
  Velibor Vasović (1966–1971)
	

 Players in bold actively play for Ajax and for their respective national teams. Years in brackets indicate career span with Ajax.

National team players by Confederation

Players in international tournaments
The following is a list of Ajax players who have competed in international tournaments, including the FIFA World Cup, FIFA Confederations Cup, UEFA European Championship, UEFA Nations League Finals, CONCACAF Nations League Finals, CONCACAF Gold Cup, the Copa América and the Africa Cup of Nations. To this date no Ajax players have participated in the AFC Asian Cup, or the OFC Nations Cup while playing for Ajax.

Notes
M.   Player who later managed the club.
Loan spells
 Stanley Aborah played for FC Den Bosch on loan from 2005–06 before leaving the club after his loan spell.
 Ismaïl Aissati played for Vitesse on loan from 2010–11, returning to Ajax for one more season, before leaving the club in 2012.
 Jamal Akachar played for Cambuur on loan for three seasons (2004–05, 2005–06 and 2006–07, before leaving Ajax after his loan spells.
 Robert Alberts played for Vancouver Whitecaps in the North American Soccer League on loan for one season in 1975.
 Lucas Andersen played for Willem II on loan for the 2015–16 Eredivisie season, parting ways with Ajax after his loan spell.
 Zakaria El Azzouzi played on loan for FC Twente in 2016, Sparta Rotterdam in 2016–17, and Excelsior in 2016–2017, leaving Ajax after his loan spells.
 Tijani Babangida played for Gençlerbirliği on loan from 2000–01, Vitesse from 2001–02 and for Al-Ittihad from 2002–03, before leaving Ajax definitely that same year.
 Ryan Babel was loaned from Galatasaray in 2020 for 6-months, returning to the Turkish club after his loan spell.
 Hassane Bandé played for FC Thun in the Swiss Super League in 2020 on a 6-month loan spell from Ajax and for NK Istra 1961 in the 1. HNL for 6 months in 2021.
 Kiran Bechan played for Sparta Rotterdam on loan during the 2003–04 season before leaving Ajax after his loan spell.
 Sheraldo Becker played for PEC Zwolle on loan for the 2015–16 Eredivisie season, parting ways with Ajax after his loan spell.
 Marco Bizot played for Cambuur on loan in 2011–12 before leaving Ajax after his loan spell.
 Daley Blind played for Groningen on loan in 2010 before returning to Ajax to play four more seasons.
 Emmanuel Boakye played for Heracles on loan during the 2006–07 season, before signing with the club after his loan spell.
 Ilan Boccara played for Evian Thonon Gaillard on loan for the 2013–14 Ligue 1 season in France, before leaving Ajax after his loan spell.
 Darko Bodul played for Sparta Rotterdam on loan for the 2009–10 season before leaving Ajax after his loan spell.
 Derk Boerrigter played for HFC Haarlem on loan in 2007, departing from Ajax after his loan spell, only to return to Ajax in 2011, leaving Ajax after two seasons.
 Roly Bonevacia played for NAC Breda on loan during the 2011–12 season, returning to Ajax for six months, before being loaned to Roda JC.
 Sven Botman played for Heerenveen on loan for the 2019–20 season before parting ways with the club after his loan spell.
 Nourdin Boukhari played for NAC Breda on loan from 2003–04, before leaving Ajax in 2006.
 Brian Brobbey was loaned from RB Leipzig in January 2022 on a six month loan spell to finish the season.
 Mateo Cassierra played for Groningen in 2018 and for Racing in the Argentine Primera División for 2019–20 season before leaving Ajax.
 Geoffrey Castillion played for RKC Waalwijk on loan during the 2011–12 season, Heracles in 2012–13 and NEC in 2014, leaving Ajax after consecutive loan spells.
 Juan Castillo was loaned from Chelsea for the 2019–20 season, returning to England after his loan spell.
 Daniel Cruz played for Germinal Beerschot on loan in 2002 before returning to Ajax for one more season.
 Isaac Cuenca was loaned from Barcelona in 2013 during the winter transfer window, playing for Ajax for the remainder of the 2012–13 season.
 Jason Culina played for Germinal Beerschot on loan in 2001, and was loaned to De Graafschap for the 2002–03 season, returning to Ajax for one more season.
 Darío Cvitanich played for Pachuca on loan in 2010, and was loaned out to Boca Juniors for the 2011–12 season, leaving Ajax after his loan spell.
 Eskild Dall played for Aarhus GF on loan for the second half of the 2021–22 season on a 6-month loan spell.
 Danilo played for FC Twente on loan for the 2020–21 season, returning to Ajax after his loan spell.
 Mohamed Daramy was loaned to Copenhagen for the 2022–23 season.
 Erik De Haan played for Telstar on loan in 1986, returning to Ajax and remaining with the club for two more years.
 Tom De Mul played for Vitesse on loan for the 2005–06 season, returning to Ajax for one more season.
 Patrickson Delgado was loaned from Independiente del Valle for the 2021–22 and the 2022–23 season.
 Joey Didulica played for Germinal Beerschot in 2001, returning to Ajax for two more seasons, before leaving the club.
 Mitchell Dijks played for Heerenveen on loan for the 2013–14 season, where he is currently active.
 Mitchell Donald played for Willem II in 2010, returning to Ajax for just one more season.
 Darl Douglas played for RBC on loan for the 2000–01 Eredivisie season, followed by two consecutive loan spells with HFC Haarlem before parting ways with Ajax.
 Terrence Douglas was loaned to FC Den Bosch midway through the 2021–22 season.
 Lerin Duarte played for Heerenveen on a 6-month loan spell in 2015, spending another 6-month loan spell with NAC Breda before departing from Ajax.
 Zé Eduardo was loaned to Ajax from Cruzeiro for the 2009–10 season, returning to his club after his loan spell.
 Carel Eiting played for Huddersfield Town in the EFL Championship on loan from Ajax in the 2020–21 season.
 Eyong Enoh was loaned to Fulham for six months during the 2012–13 season and to Antalyaspor for six months in 2013–14 before leaving the club.
 Filipe Luís was loaned to Ajax from Figueirense for the 2004–05 season before leaving Ajax after his loan spell.
 Pál Fischer was loaned to Ajax from Ferencváros for the 1989–90 season, returning to Hungary after his loan spell.
 Hans Galjé played for Utrecht on loan in 1986, before leaving Ajax after his loan period.
 Giovanni played for Telstar on a 6-month loan spell in 2022,
 Jay Gorter was loaned to Scottish Premiership side Aberdeen for the remainder of the 2022–23 season
 Danzell Gravenberch played for N.E.C. on loan for the second half of the 2013–14 season, leaving Ajax shortly after his return.
 Indy Groothuizen played for Nordsjælland in the Danish Superliga in 2016–17, parting ways with Ajax following his loan spell.
 Cedric van der Gun played for Willem II on loan for the 2002–03 season, leaving Ajax after his loan spell.
 Jan van Halst played for Fortuna Sittard on loan for the 2000–01 season, returning to Ajax for one more season after his loan spell.
 Mickey van der Hart played for Go Ahead Eagles on loan for the 2013–14 Eredivisie season, leaving Ajax following his loan spell.
 Jan-Arie van der Heijden played two consecutive loan spells from 2009–2011 for Willem II, before leaving Ajax after his loan spell.
 Peter Hoekstra played for Compostela for the 1999–2000 season, and Groningen in 2000–01, before leaving Ajax after his loan spell.
 Danny Hoesen played for PAOK in the Greek Super League on loan from Ajax in 2014, parting ways with Ajax after his loan spell.
 Brutil Hosé played on loan for De Graafschap in 2000–01, HFC Haarlem in 2001–02, and Sparta Rotterdam in 2002–03, leaving Ajax after his final loan spell.
 Pius Ikedia played for Groningen on loan from 2002–03 and RBC Roosendaal on loan from 2003–05, before leaving Ajax that same year.
 Oussama Idrissi was loaned from Sevilla for the remainder of the 2020–21 season.
 Mohamed Ihattaren was loaned from Juventus midway through the 2021–22 season on a 1-year loan spell.
 Victor Jensen was loaned to FC Nordsjælland on a 6-month loan spell for the second half of the 2020–21 season. In 2022 he was loaned for a year to Norwegian club Rosenborg BK.
 Dennis Johnsen played for Heerenveen in 2019, and for PEC Zwolle in 2019–20 on loan, parting ways with Ajax after his loan spells.
 Siem de Jong played on loan for Sydney FC in the 2018–19 A-League season in Australia, leaving Ajax after his loan spell.
 Florian Jozefzoon played for NAC Breda on loan during the 2011–12 season, leaving Ajax after his loan spell.
 Juanfran was loaned from Beşiktaş J.K. for the 2005–06 Eredivisie season, returning to Turkey after his loan spell.
 Mariano Juan played for Racing Club on loan during the 1998–99 Argentine Primera División season, returning to Ajax for one more season, before leaving the club.
 Joeri de Kamps played for Heerenveen on loan for the 2013–14 Eredivisie season, leaving Ajax after his loan spell.
 Christopher Kanu played for Lugano on loan for the 1996–97 season, Alavés on loan in 2001, and Sparta Rotterdam on loan in 2002, leaving Ajax after his last loan spell.
 Óttar Magnús Karlsson played for Sparta Rotterdam on loan from Ajax for the 2015–16 Eerste Divisie season, parting ways with Ajax following his loan spell.
 Kerlon was loaned to Ajax from Internazionale for the 2009–10 season, leaving Ajax after his loan spell.
 Gino van Kessel played for Almere City on loan for the second half of the 2012–13 season, and AS Trenčín on loan for the first half of the 2013–14 season.
 Georgi Kinkladze played for Derby County on loan for the 1999–2000 season, leaving Ajax after his loan spell.
 Richard Knopper played for Aris on loan for the 2002–03 season and Heerenveen on loan for the 2003–04 season, leaving Ajax after his loan spell.
 Dico Koppers was loaned to ADO Den Haag in the winter transfer window for the remainder of the 2012–13 season, leaving Ajax after his loan spell.
 Dominik Kotarski was loaned to HNK Gorica for the 2021–22 season, where he is currently active.
 Bojan Krkić was loaned to Ajax from Barcelona for one season in 2013, leaving the club after his loan spell.
 Michael Krohn-Dehli played for Sparta Rotterdam on loan for the 2006–07 season, returning to Ajax for one more season before leaving the club.
 Tim Krul was loaned from Newcastle United by Ajax for the 2016–17 season, returning to England after his loan spell.
 Samuel Kuffour was loaned to Ajax from Roma for six months in 2008, leaving Ajax after his loan spell.
 Nicolas-Gerrit Kühn played for Bayern Munich on loan from Ajax in 2020 before joining Bayern on a transfer that same year.
 Bas Kuipers was loaned to Excelsior for the 2014–15 season, parting ways with Ajax thereafter.
 Noa Lang played for Club Brugge on loan from Ajax for the 2020–21 Belgian Pro League season, transferring to the Belgian club at the end of the season.
 Benjamin van Leer played for NAC Breda on loan for the 2018–19 Eredivisie season, returning to Ajax for one more season before leaving the club.
 Peter Leeuwenburgh played for FC Dordrecht on loan from Ajax in 2015, returning to Amsterdam and departing three years later.
 Stanton Lewis played for Ajax Cape Town on loan for 18 months for all of 2009 and the 2009–10 season, leaving Ajax after his loan spell.
 Ruben Ligeon played for NAC Breda on loan for 6-months in 2015 and Willem II for 6-months the same year, before joining FC Utrecht on loan in 2016 and leaving Ajax after his final loan spell.
 Rasmus Lindgren played for Groningen on loan from 2005–06, transferring to them the following year and returning to Ajax in 2008, leaving the club four years later.
 Bogdan Lobonț played for Dinamo București on a loan from 2001–02, returning to Ajax before leaving the club in 2006.
 Stanislav Lobotka played for Ajax on loan from AS Trenčín for the duration of the 2013–14 season, returning to Slovakia after his loan spell.
 Lorenzo Lucca was loaned for the 2022–23 season from Pisa, on a year long loan spell.
 Jody Lukoki played for Cambuur on loan for the 2013–14 season, leaving Ajax after his loan spell.
 Albert Luque played for Málaga on loan for the 2008–09 season, before leaving Ajax after his loan spell.
 Nikos Machlas played for Sevilla on loan from 2002–03, before leaving Ajax after his loan spell.
 Lisandro Magallán played for Alavés in the Spanish La Liga in 2019–20 and Crotone in the Italian Serie A the following season. He was then loaned to Anderlecht on a season long loan spell.
 Edgar Manucharyan played for HFC Haarlem on loan from 2009–10, and AGOVV in 2010, before leaving Ajax that same year.
 Răzvan Marin played for Cagliari in the Serie A for the 2020–21 season, joining the Italian side after his loan spell.
 Javier Martina played for HFC Haarlem on loan in 2010, leaving Ajax after his loan spell.
 Azor Matusiwa played for De Graafschap on loan from Ajax in 2019 before parting ways with the club after his loan spell.
 Geert Meijer played for FC Amsterdam on loan for the 1976–77 season, returning to Ajax for two more seasons before leaving the club.
 Dejan Meleg played for Cambuur in 2014–15 Eredivisie season, parting ways with Ajax after his loan spell.
 David Mendes da Silva was loaned to Ajax from Sparta Rotterdam for six months, returning to hide former club after his loan spell.
 Queensy Menig played for PEC Zwolle on loan from Ajax for two consecutive seasons from 2015 to 2017 before leaving the club after his loan spells.
 Stanley Menzo played for HFC Haarlem on loan in 1984, returning to Ajax before leaving the club in 1994, only to return for the 1999–2000 season.
 Timothy van der Meulen played for HFC Haarlem on loan in 2010, leaving Ajax after his loan spell.
 Andy van der Meyde played for Twente on loan in the 1999–2000 season, returning to Ajax for three more seasons before leaving the club.
 Mido played for Celta de Vigo on a loan in 2003, before leaving Ajax, only to return in 2010 on a loan from Middlesbrough before leaving Ajax the same year.
 Aaron Mokoena played for Germinal Beerschot on loan in 2001, and again in 2002, returning to Ajax for one more season before leaving the club.
 Arkadiusz Milik was loaned from Bayer Leverkusen in 2014, returning to Ajax for one more season after his loan spell in 2015–16 before leaving the club.
 Robert Murić played for Pescara on loan from Ajax for the 2016–17 Serie B season, leaving Ajax after his loan spell.
 Sven Nieuwpoort played for Almere City on loan during the 2012–13 season, where he transferred during the winter transfer window, and once more for the 2013–14 season, before leaving Ajax.
 Anthony Obodai played for Germinal Beerschot on loan during the 2002–03 season, returning to Ajax for two more seasons before leaving the club.
 John O'Brien played for Utrecht on loan from 1998–99, returning to Ajax before leaving the club in 2005.
 Lucas Ocampos was loaned from Sevilla FC for the 2022–23 season, returning to Sevilla early in January 2023 in the winter transfer window.
 George Ogăraru played for Steaua București during the 2008–09 season, returning to Ajax for one more season before leaving the club.
 Luis Manuel Orejuela played for Cruzeiro in the Série A on loan from Ajax in 2019, joining the Brazilian side after his loan spell.
 Rene Osei Kofi played for Almere City FC on loan in 2010, his loan spell and contract with Ajax were then terminated for unsportsmanlike conduct.
 Tom Overtoom played for HFC Haarlem on loan in 2009, returning to Ajax for one more season after his loan spell before leaving the club.
 Leeroy Owusu played for Excelsior in 2016–17 and Almere City and 2017–18 on loan from Ajax, parting ways with the club after his loan spells.
 Sergio Padt played for HFC Haarlem on loan in 2010, and Go Ahead Eagles during the 2010–11 season, before leaving Ajax after his loan spell.
 Petri Pasanen played for Portsmouth on loan in 2004, before leaving Ajax that same year.
 Kik Pierie played for FC Twente in the 2020–21 and the 2021–22 Eredivisie seasons on loan, and for Excelsior for the second half of the 2022–23 season.
 Mitchell Piqué played for Twente on loan for the 2000–01 season, HFC Haarlem in 2002, and RBC Roosendaal for the 2002–03 season, leaving Ajax after his loan spell.
 Rydell Poepon played for Willem II on loan for the 2006–07 and 2007–08 seasons, before leaving Ajax after his loan spells.
 Kwame Quansah played for Germinal Beerschot during the 2002–03 season and AIK during the 2003–04 season, leaving Ajax after his loan periods.
 Erik Regtop played for Telstar on loan in 1987–88 and for Groningen in 1988–89, returning to Ajax for one more season before leaving the club.
 Michael Reiziger played for Volendam on loan from 1992–93, and Groningen from 1993–94, before returning to Ajax for one more season.
 Martijn Reuser played for Vitesse on loan during the 1997–98 and 1998-1999 seasons, leaving Ajax after his loan spells.
 Dennis Rommedahl played for N.E.C. on loan from 2008–09, before returning to Ajax for one more season before leaving the club.
 Lesley de Sa played for Go Ahead Eagles in the 2014–15 season and Willem II in the 2015–16 season, leaving Ajax after his loan spells.
 Anass Salah-Eddine was loaned to Twente by Ajax for the 2022–23 Eredivisie season.
 Yaya Sanogo was loaned from Arsenal by Ajax for the 2015–16 Eredivisie season, returning to England after his loan spell.
 Gastón Sangoy was loaned to Ajax from Boca Juniors in 2005 for six months before leaving the club after his loan period.
 Jeffrey Sarpong played for N.E.C. on loan in 2010 for six months, leaving Ajax after his loan spell.
 Werner Schaaphok played for Blauw-Wit on loan for the 1965–66 season and for AGOVV during the 1966–67 season before leaving the club after both his loan spells.
 Xandro Schenk played for Go Ahead Eagles on loan for the remainder of the 2012–13 season, making the transfer during the winter transfer window, where he is currently active.
 Robbert Schilder played for Heracles on loan for the 2006–07, and the 2007–08 seasons, returning to Ajax for one more season before leaving the club.
 Perr Schuurs played for Fortuna Sittard on loan for 6- months in 2017–18, joining Ajax after his loan spell.
 Stefano Seedorf played for NAC Breda on loan for the 2003–04 season, before leaving Ajax after his loan spell.
 Kaj Sierhuis played for Groningen on loan for the 2018–19 season, remaining with Ajax for one more season before parting ways with the club.
 Victor Sikora played for Heerenveen on loan in 2004–05 and played for NAC Breda on loan in 2005–06, 2006–07 and in 2007–08, leaving Ajax after his loan spells.
 Bruno Silva played for Internacional on loan in 2010 before returning to Ajax for two more seasons.
 Donovan Slijngard played for Groningen on loan in 2007, before returning to Ajax for one more season.
 Rodney Sneijder played for Utrecht on loan for the 2011–12 season, before leaving Ajax after his loan spell.
 Evander Sno played for Bristol City on loan for the 2009–10 season, returning to Ajax for one more season, before leaving the club.
 Måns Sörensson was loaned from Swedish club Landskrona BoIS for the 2003–04 season before returning to his club after his loan spell.
 Fabian Sporkslede played for Willem II on loan for the 2014–15 season, leaving the club after his loan spell.
 Frank Stapleton played for Anderlecht on loan in 1988, before leaving Ajax after her loan spell.
 Henk Timmer was loaned to Ajax from AZ for the 2002–03 season, returning to his club after the loan spell.
 Henri Toivomäki played for Almere City on loan during the 2012–13 season before leaving Ajax after his loan spell.
 Bertrand Traoré was loaned from Chelsea during the 2016–17 season, returning to England after his loan spell.
 Ignacio Tuhuteru played for RBC Roosendaal on loan for the 1994–95 season before leaving Ajax after his loan spell.
 Naci Ünüvar played for Trabzonspor on loan for the 2021–22 season.
 Bruno Varela was loaned from Benfica by Ajax for the 2019–20 season, returning to Portugal after his loan spell.
 Thomas Vermaelen played for RKC Waalwijk on loan from 2004–05 before returning to Ajax to play four more seasons.
 Kenneth Vermeer played for Willem II on loan for the 2007–08 season before returning to Ajax to play six more seasons.
 Jan Vertonghen played for RKC Waalwijk on loan from 2006–07, returning to Ajax to play five more seasons.
 Max de Waal played for PEC Zwolle on a 6-month loan spell in 2021–22 season, followed by a season-long loan spell with ADO Den Haag where he is currently active.
 Walker played for Germinal Beerschot on loan in 2002–03 season, returning to Ajax for six months before leaving the club.
 Wamberto played for R.A.E.C. Mons on loan in 2004 before leaving Ajax after his loan spell.
 Rob Wielaert played for Roda JC on loan during the 2010–11 season, leaving Ajax after his loan spell.
 Aron Winter played for Sparta Rotterdam on loan from 2001–02, retiring from football after that season.
 Richard Witschge played for Alavés on loan from 2001–02 before returning to Ajax for one more season.
 Maximilian Wöber played for Sevilla on loan in 2019, joining the Spanish side after his loan spell.
 Abubakari Yakubu played for Vitesse on loan during the 2004–05 season departing from Ajax after his loan spell.
 Marvin Zeegelaar played for Excelsior in 2011 before leaving Ajax after his loan spell.
 Niki Zimling was loaned from Mainz 05 for the 2014–15 before leaving Ajax after his loan spell.
 Richairo Živković played for Willem II on loan in 2015, and FC Utrecht for the 2016–17 season. leaving the club after his loan spells.

Loan spells by country

References
 

Players
 
Association football player non-biographical articles
Ajax